Rogério Pedro Campinho Marques Matias (born 22 October 1974 in Vila Franca de Xira, Lisbon) is a Portuguese former footballer who played as a left back.

Football career
During his career, Matias represented AD Fafe, Amora FC, Académica de Coimbra, C.F. União de Coimbra, F.C. Maia, S.C. Campomaiorense, Vitória Sport Clube – his most steady period was spent with the Guimarães club as he played in six consecutive Primeira Liga seasons, starting in five of those – Standard Liège and Rio Ave FC, retiring at nearly 35.

Matias made his debut with Portugal in 2003, earning five caps under manager Luiz Felipe Scolari. Over nine seasons in his country's top division, he amassed totals of 221 matches and five goals.

References

External links

1974 births
Living people
People from Vila Franca de Xira
Portuguese footballers
Association football defenders
Primeira Liga players
Liga Portugal 2 players
Segunda Divisão players
AD Fafe players
Amora F.C. players
Associação Académica de Coimbra – O.A.F. players
F.C. Maia players
S.C. Campomaiorense players
Vitória S.C. players
Rio Ave F.C. players
Belgian Pro League players
Standard Liège players
Portugal international footballers
Portuguese expatriate footballers
Expatriate footballers in Belgium
Portuguese expatriate sportspeople in Belgium
Sportspeople from Lisbon District